Dwinsk may refer to:
 Daugavpils, a city in southeastern Latvia
 SS Dwinsk, a British-flagged ocean liner sunk by in 1918